Compu-Read is an educational program originally developed by Sherwin Steffin of Edu-Ware Services in 1979 for the Apple II. It consists of four modules training the user in rapidly increasing comprehension and retention: Character Recognition, High-speed word recognition, Synonyms; Sentence Comprehension.  In each, the user the initial difficulty level, and the computer matches the display speed to the user's performance.

Steffin first wrote Compu-Read as a text-based program while serving as a research analyst at UCLA.  The first version was published by Programma International but after being laid off from the university, he revised Compu-Read and used it to launch his new company, Edu-Ware.  Edu-Ware upgraded the program to high resolution graphics using its EWS3 graphics engine in 1981, renamed it Compu-Read 3.0 and ported it to the Atari 8-bit family, Commodore 64, and IBM PC.  Compu-Read was featured in Edu-Ware's catalogs until its closure in 1985.

References

Apple II software
Atari 8-bit family software
Commodore 64 software
Edu-Ware educational software